Vremya (lit. "Time") is the main evening newscast in Russia, airing on Channel One Russia (Russian: , Pervy kanal) and previously on Programme One of the Central Television of the USSR (CT USSR,). The programme has been on the air since 1 January 1968 (there were no broadcasts from August 1991 to December 1994) and has broadcast in color since 1974.

Editorial line
In the Soviet days of Vremya, the programme had a pro-government bias and typically did not report on news that could potentially fuel anti-government sentiment. The programme presented reports that promoted socialism and portrayed the West in a negative manner. The newsroom was tied to the Politburo of the Communist Party of the Soviet Union's Central Committee. This situation changed after Glasnost, when a director of news was introduced alongside the news being sourced from official outlets. This made CT USSR report accurately on the collapse of the Soviet Union's satellite communist countries in Eastern Europe in 1989. This also made Vremya to be shown uncensored and critical, triggering the protests that hastened the end of the Soviet Union.

In the Russian Federation era, Vremya became a "flagship propaganda outlet" of the government. Reporting during the 2022 Russian invasion of Ukraine featured the Kremlin's messaging, at the same time independent news outlets were shut down.

Schedule and popularity
Vremya is produced in three daily editions, scheduled for transmission in Moscow at 13:00, 17:00 and 21:00 local time (= UTC+3), the last of these having been the programme's main edition ever since its inception in 1968. Given the country's vast size (it stretches over eleven time zones) editions of Vremya are also broadcast (either live or deferred) at Moscow time plus two, four, six, and eight hours, according to locality.

During the Soviet era, the programme's main edition was also carried simultaneously on the primary channel of each republican station: AzTV, Belarus 1, Eesti Televisioon, Georgian Public Broadcasting, Kazakhstan-1, Channel 1 of the Kiev Telecentre, LTV1, Lithuanian National Radio and Television, Uzbekistan 1, etc. The program was also simulcast in autonomous republics as well. Since the premier in 1968, Vremya has been aired via satellite.

The broadcast lasts 30 minutes, but in special circumstances (more especially during the Soviet era), the broadcast is extended beyond the 30 minutes allotted when necessary (such as the Red Square state ceremonies and parades, CPSU Party Congress telecasts together with other CPSU-led activities, plenary sessions of the Supreme Soviet of the USSR, and deaths of Soviet leaders Leonid Brezhnev, Yuri Andropov and Konstantin Chernenko). Even highlights of the celebrations of the Union-wide holidays were also broadcast.

Starting in the mid-1970s, another 30-minute late edition was presented on the All-Union Programme (launched in 1956) around 11:00 pm. (This was in the form of a live simulcast of Vremya in the next Orbita transmission zone, occasionally a repeat of the 9:00 pm programme, especially in the European USSR.) Prior to that, both channels aired Vremya simultaneously at 9:00 pm, then repeated the next morning when the First Programme signed on around 7:30 am (later 6:30 am) after the exercise programme, before airing children's programming and schools and colleges programmes, all produced together with the USSR Ministry of Education and were also seen on Programme 4. Later, a live morning edition was shown at 6:30 am, before the breakfast programme 120 minut (which continues today on Channel One Russia as Dobroye Utro,) on weekdays (on weekends Vremya aired at 8:00 am after sign-on).

News summaries were added as the transmissions increased during the day. There was a bulletin at the end of the morning and midday programmes (i.e. around 1:00 pm), an afternoon edition at 3:00 pm, and another at 6:30 pm on the first channel. From 1989, the latter bulletin began to use the two presenter format of Vremya, as well as the Vremya moniker, and its corresponding studio and graphics (including the title sequence and theme music), looking as it was the program's first edition (the 6:30 am program was the morning news edition while the one at 1 pm was the midday update), with the 9:00 pm telecast as the second (main) edition and the one at 11:00 pm as the third or late edition or the late night replay. The All-Union Programme's daytime schedule always began with the news at around 15:00. Midnight newscasts did not appear until the 1980s, when the First Programme screened a headline update preceding the closedown sequence, usually after midnight. All of these bulletins were known as Novosti (Russian: , "The News"). From 1989, the 15:00 news round-up on the All-Union Programme and the midnight news round-up on the First Programme were known as TSN: Television News Service (Russian: TCH: , TSN:Televizionnaya sluzhba novostey), which ended in 1991. Today the news on Channel One Russia follows a similar schedule to this one, with Vremya, Novosti, and the all-Russian and regional news updates.

The majority of Russians rely on Vremya as a trusted news source.

Between 1980 to 1984, and since 1986, Vremya has used the theme song from Time, Forward! as its signature tune and opening sequence.

In a two-week test that lasted from 12 to 23 February 1990, more than 100 PBS member stations across the United States broadcast Vremya. The test was coordinated by WGBH-TV. The test was then extended for another two weeks, but was not carried by all of the same stations.

Coverage during the last days of the USSR
After the introduction of the glasnost and perestroika, Vremya loosened its fidelity to the party line and began presenting fair reports about the events transforming Eastern Europe at the time. On 15 March 1989 150 million Soviet citizens watched as the station aired an 85-page speech by Gorbachev to a plenum of the CPSU Central Committee criticizing the poor state of agriculture and setting out the case for reforms, the highlights of that address being featured on that day's telecast.

In the 1980s, 86% of Soviet adults relied on television coverage as their primary source of news. Yet Vremya was seen as "a joke" by many Soviet citizens due to its poor coverage of news events. The coverage of the Chernobyl nuclear disaster, for example, was often relegated to lesser news items during the ongoing coverage of the disaster; in contrast, western news media such as CBS Evening News led with the story for six consecutive weekdays. Following the evacuation of the nuclear workers' closed city of Pripyat, Vremya issued the following brief announcement:

In 1987 the program logo appeared for the first time in its studio. 1988 saw a big change for the newscast as its studios featured picture backdrops for the first time, and debuted a new logo, with a styled letter В in a box (this was the year of its 20th anniversary). On 19 August 1991 it showed pictures of the impending coup d'etat in Moscow for the first time, albeit in the new styled studios which opened in 1990.

Vremya covered highlights of the March 1989 elections for the Congress of People's Deputies of the Soviet Union and the sessions of the Congress in Moscow, making interviews with its leadership and deputies.

Transition
The last Soviet-era Vremya newscast was broadcast on 27 August 1991 and replaced with another news programme known as TV-Inform the following day. The closure was due to pressure from RSFSR President Boris Yeltsin claiming that the programme was "too tied to the CPSU", but according to the news anchors themselves it was due to CT USSR being forced to lay off a large number of their staff which were said to be KGB agents. When the USSR dissolved in December that year, the programme, now Novosti Ostankino, changed broadcasters from Soviet Central Television to the new Ostankino Television 1 and 4. During the network's name change to ORT-1 (Public Russian Television-1,) in April 1995, and Ostankino 4's earlier 1994 reformatting into NTV, the newscast was integrated as part of the Novosti ITA brand of newscasts with the 9pm edition being the flagship.

Vremya returned on 16 December 1994, in time to report on the looming conflict in Chechenya. The format was then changed to that of a single-presenter one, but the dual-presenter one was kept for special editions of the program, and was even incorporated into the newscast's 1995-99 opening sequence. Special New Year's Day openers debuted in 1998, in celebration of the program's 30th anniversary.

On 1 January 2018 the program celebrated its 50th anniversary. Russian President Vladimir Putin visited the studio and congratulated the staff for the occasion.

Sunday Vremya
On Sundays since the late 1980s, the programme also has a separate Sunday edition, initially called Seven Days (Sem' d'nei), since 2003 known as Sunday Vremya (Voskresnoe Vremya, Sunday Time). This programme also airs a roundup of the week's news. Until its launch, Vremya was shown as per Monday-Saturday. Sunday Vremya debuted on the then Programme One of Soviet Central Television in 1989.

2022 anti-war protest 

During a live Vremya broadcast related to the 2022 Russian invasion of Ukraine, on 14 March 2022, employee Marina Ovsyannikova appeared behind the news anchor, Ekaterina Andreeva, holding a poster, made visible to millions of viewers, which stated, in a mix of Russian and English:

Presenters

Soviet-era edition
 Vera Shebeko
 Igor Kirillov - chief presenter until the 1980s, reporting on major events such as the Red Square ceremonies and overseas visits of the Soviet leader
 Maya Sidrova
 Evgeny Suslov
 Gennady Chetrov
 Evgeny Kochergin
 Inna Ermilova
 Elena Kovalenko
 Anna Shatilova
 Yuri Kovelenov
 Tatyana Sudets
 Victor Balashov
 Aza Lihitchenko
 Galina Zimenkova
 Nonna Bodrova
 Sergey Medvedev
 Leonid Elin
 Igor Fesunenko

Russian Federation-era edition
 Igor Vykhuholev: 1994–2003
 Nelly Petkova: 1994–1996
 Tatiana Komarova: 1994–1995
 Igor Gmyza: 1995–1999
 Alexandra Buratayeva: 1995–1999
 Arina Sharapova: 1996–1998
 Sergey Dorenko: 1996–1999 (Information-analytic programme "VREMYA with Sergey Dorenko")
 Kirill Kleimyonov: 1998–2005, 2018–2020
 Zhanna Agalakova: 1998–2007                                                                                                                      
 Pavel Sheremet: 1999–2001 (Information-analytic programme "VREMYA", Saturday)
 Andrey Baturin: 2003–2005: ("VREMYA" at night, literally "Night time")
 Pyotr Marchenko: 2003–2005
 Olga Kokorekina: 2007–2008
 Pyotr Tolstoy 2005–2012 (Information-analytic programme "Sunday VREMYA")
 Maxim Sharafutdinov: 2007–? (Summer releases to the Far East and Siberia + CIS and other countries)
 Dmitry Borisov: 2011–2017
 Irada Zeinalova: 2012–2016 (Information-analytic programme "Sunday VREMYA")
 Valery Fadeyev: 2016–2018 (Information-analytic programme "Sunday VREMYA")

Current presenters                                                                                                       
 Ekaterina Andreeva: 1997–present
 Mikhail Leontyev: 1999–present
 Vitaly Eliseyev: 2007–present
 Andrei Ukharev: 2018–present (Information-analytic programme "Sunday VREMYA")
 Ekaterina Berezovskaya: 2020–present (Information-analytic programme "Sunday VREMYA")

Similar newscasts in other socialist countries
 Aktuelle Kamera (1952) – Deutscher Fernsehfunk – East Germany
 Dziennik Telewizyjny (1958) – TVP – Poland
 Televizní Noviny (1958) – ČST – Czechoslovakia (continues today on TV Nova within the Czech Republic only, 1994-)
 Híradó (1957) – Magyar Televízió – Hungary
 Panorama (Панорама, 1968) – BNT – Bulgaria
 Po sveta i u nas (По света и у нас, 1960) – BNT – Bulgaria
 Telejurnal (1966) – TVR – Romania
 Dnevnik (Дневник, 1959) – JRT – Yugoslavia
 Revista Televizive - RTSH - Albania
 Xinwen Lianbo (Broadcast News, 新闻联播, 1978) – CCTV – People's Republic of China
 Podo (Report, 보도) – Korean Central Television – North Korea
 Noticiero Nacional de la Televisión Cubana (1961) – Cubavision – Cuba
 Thời sự (Current Events, 1971) Vietnam Television - Vietnam

See also
 Marina Ovsyannikova

References

External links 
 The U.S. Naval Academy Collection of Soviet & Russian TV
 Much of this article was translated from the Russian Wikipedia article about it.
 Time, Forward! (Vremya, vpered!), the famous theme tune by Georgy Sviridov

1964 Soviet television series debuts
Soviet television series
Russian television news shows
1960s Soviet television series
1970s Soviet television series
1980s Soviet television series
1990s Russian television series
2000s Russian television series
2010s Russian television series
Channel One Russia original programming
Flagship evening news shows